The Iowa Department of Education sets the standards for all public institutions of education in Iowa and accredits private as well as public schools. It is headquartered in Des Moines. The Iowa Department of Education consists of 8 bureaus. The department works with the oversight of the Board of Education. The Board of Education consists of 11 members and was founded in 1857. The Department of Education uses the Iowa Statewide Assessment for Student Progress (ISASP). As of 2019, the board allocated $2.7 million for school districts and $300,000 for accredited nonpublic schools.

References

External links
Iowa Department of Education

Department of Education, Iowa
State departments of education of the United States
Education, Department of, Iowa